Trudy Benson (born 1985) is an American abstract painter who lives and works in Brooklyn, NY.

Early life and work
Trudy Benson was born in Richmond, Virginia in 1985. She received a BFA from Virginia Commonwealth University in 2007 and an MFA from the Pratt Institute in Brooklyn, New York in 2010.

Benson is known for her large scale abstract paintings that utilize large swaths and globs of paint. Her style was influenced by early computer painting programs, such as MacPaint and Microsoft Paint.  Critics have linked Benson's work to artistic movements such as abstract illusionism and Post-War New York Abstraction. Related painters include Hans Hoffman, Jonathan Lasker, Al Held, and Keltie Ferris.

Critical reception 
In December 2012, Scott Indrisek wrote for Modern Painters that, "This young Pratt-educated painter is moving away from her previous cartoonishly figurative efforts and toward a maximalist abstraction. The effect is a bit like a 1980s geometry textbook spazzing out and exploding on the wall. Benson works within a deliciously caffeinated language of gestures and shapes-the smear, the dripping line, rainbows, grids, circles-to create compositions that pair smooth, glossy sections with paint applied so thickly it resembles Play-Doh."

In May 2013, New York Times Art Critic Karen Rosenberg lauded Benson's paintings at the Lower East Side's Horton Gallery (now Sean Horton Presents in Dallas Texas). In her review, she wrote that her canvases resemble the proportions of early mac computers, and "mimic the squiggly, uncontrollable lines and seemingly miraculous instant color-fills of 1980s graphics programs like MacPaint." She went on to conclude, "There is a deliberate heaviness to her work, an impasto that no screen can yet evoke."

"Shapes of Things" at Lisa Cooley was described as a move "beyond the jokey use of tropes culled from computer-graphics programs" and a turn to drawing by Stephen Maine in the summer 2015 issue of ARTnews.

While critical of her overall show at Lyles & King in 2018, New York Times Art Critic Martha Schwendener, described an in situ installation made of spray paint and canvas as indicative of her best work. "Ragged and kind of punk, it reminds you of what made Ms. Benson’s art exciting in the first place when, armed with analog paint and digital thinking, she took on the history of painting and won a round."

References

External links 
Lyles & King Gallery
Ribordy Contemporary
Ceysson & Bénétière
 8 Great Brooklyn Artists Under 30
 Review: Trudy Benson 'Paint' @ Horton Gallery The New York Times
Running the Gamut: Trudy Benson's Flamboyant Restraint
 https://www.cocurata.com/pages/trudy-benson
 Publication on the artist Trudy Benson, Ceysson éditions d'Art, 2017

1985 births
Living people
21st-century American painters
21st-century American women artists
American women painters
Painters from Virginia
Pratt Institute alumni
Virginia Commonwealth University alumni